Evelyn George Massey Carmichael (of Carmichael) (3 April 1871 – 14 July 1959) was an English cricketer who played a single first-class game, for Worcestershire against Oxford University in 1903; in the first innings he was bowled for 5 by his namesake Evelyn Martin (who also played for Worcestershire that season), while in the second he was run out for 1. He took one catch, to dismiss Martin.

Carmichael also played for Worcestershire in the 1890s, before they had attained first-class status. He was educated at Harrow before going up to Oxford, although he did not excel at cricket while at either establishment.

Carmichael was born in Upper Wick, Worcester; he died aged 88 at Berrington Hall, Shrewsbury.

External links
 
 Statistical summary from CricketArchive

1871 births
1959 deaths
People from Malvern Hills District
People educated at Harrow School
English cricketers
Worcestershire cricketers
Sportspeople from Worcestershire